Appi Aamchi Collector is an Indian Marathi language television series produced by Shweta Shinde and Sanjay Khambe under the banner of Vajra Productions. It is airing on Zee Marathi by replacing Satyawan Savitri. It stars Shivani Naik and Rohit Parshuram in lead roles.

Cast

Main 
 Shivani Naik as Aparna Suresh Mane / Aparna Arjun Kadam (Appi)
 Rohit Parshuram as Arjun Vinayak Kadam (Shahenshah)

Recurring 
Arjun's family
 Pradeep Kothmire as Hambirrao Bhaurao Kadam (Sarkar)
 Shrikant K.T. as Vinayak Bhaurao Kadam
 Aarti Shinde as Smita Bhaurao Kadam
 Daya Eksammekar as Rukmini Hambirrao Kadam
 Rishab Kondavar as Sujay Hambirrao Kadam
 Neelam Wadekar as Priyanka Sujay Kadam (Piyu)
 Vajra Pawar as Arnav Sujay Kadam
 Makarand Gosavi as Swapnil Hambirrao Kadam
 Sarita Nalawade as Rupali Swapnil Kadam

Appi's family
 Beena Siddharth as Sushma Suresh Mane
 Santosh Patil as Suresh Mane (Bapu)
 Aditya Bhosale as Deepak Suresh Mane (Dipya)

Others
 Bhakti Zanzane as Sunanda
 Swara Patil as Chakuli
 Shivani Ghatge as Geetanjali Jadhav
 Prem Jadhav as Prithvi Prataprao Jadhav
 Rajbhushan Sahastrabuddhe as MLA Prataprao Jadhav
 Pradeep Walake as Rocket
 Shekhar Sawant as Chichoke
 Madhav Solaskar as Aslam
 Sunil Dongar as Sankalp Dhobale
 Pushpa Chaudhari as Mani Mavshi

Reception

Special episode

1 hour 
 20 November 2022
 15 January 2023
 19 February 2023
 19 March 2023

1.30 hours 
 25 December 2022 (Appi-Arjun's marriage)

References

External links 
 Appi Aamchi Collector at ZEE5

Marathi-language television shows
2022 Indian television series debuts
Zee Marathi original programming